Mandra may refer to:

Mandra, a town in West Attica, Greece
Mandra, Larissa, a village in Larissa regional unit, Greece
Mandra, Xanthi, a settlement in the Xanthi regional unit, Greece
Mandra, Haskovo Province, a village in the municipality of Haskovo, Bulgaria
Mandra (Sokolac), a village in the municipality of Sokolac, Bosnia and Herzegovina
Mandra (novel), a novel by S. L. Bhyrappa
Mandra (short story), a short story by Anaïs Nin (in her Little Birds (short story collection))

See also
Mândra (disambiguation)